Yıldızeli is a town and a district of Sivas Province of Turkey. The mayor is Mehmet Sabit Karakaş (AK Parti). Yıldızeli has a broad and colorful history and culture. Various social communities reside in Yıldızeli, such as Alevis, Turkmens, Circassians, etc. The district has a lot of touristic places as well as hot springs which are claimed to be curative for some diseases.

Yıldızeli has been identified as the site of the town of Phiara which, according to Ptolemy, was located in the district of Sargarausena in Cappadocia.

References

Populated places in Sivas Province
Districts of Sivas Province